Annika Noelle (born December 24, 1986), is an American actress and model best known for playing the role of Hope Logan in the soap The Bold and the Beautiful.

Biography 
Annika Noelle was born in Boston, Massachusetts (United States). Since she was a child she showed interest in the performing arts, so when she was older she left her hometown to move to Los Angeles and attend the School of Theater, Film, and Television at the University of California, Los Angeles.

Career 
Annika Noelle completed her acting studies at the University of California, Los Angeles. And in 2011 she played the role of Suzanna Wayne in the television film Love's Christmas Journey directed by David S. Cass Sr. In the same year she starred in the short films Sea Sick directed by Patrick Brooks and Found directed by Anthony Bushman. Also in 2011 she participated in the music video Howlin' for You by The Black Keys and directed by Chris Marrs Piliero. In 2011 and 2012 she played the role of Sami Nelson in the series Venice: The Series.

In 2014 she went on to play the role of Nick's Date in the film Jersey Boys directed by Clint Eastwood where she sang a live version of A Sunday Kind of Love. In 2015, she had a recurring role in Chasing Life (as Abbi / Intern). In the same year she played the role of Melissa Jennings in the film Evan's Crime directed by Sandy Tung. In 2017 she played the role of Aubrey in the film True to the Game directed by Preston A. Whitmore II. 

Since 2018 she has been chosen to play the role of Hope Logan in the soap opera The Bold and the Beautiful. In the following years, she participated in the game show Let's Make a Deal. That same year she was nominated at the Daytime Emmy Awards for Outstanding Supporting Actress in a Drama Series for the soap The Bold and the Beautiful.

Filmography

Films

TV series

Music video

Television programs

Awards and nominations

References

External links 
 
 

Living people
1986 births
American actresses
American female models
21st-century American women